Michel-Étienne Turgot (9 June 1690, Paris – 1 February 1751, Paris) was prévôt des marchands de Paris ("Master of the merchants of Paris", i.e. Mayor of Paris) from 1729 to 1740. His name is associated with one of the most famous maps of Paris, the  "Plan de Turgot" ("Turgot Map"), a detailed bird's-eye view of Paris realized by Louis Bretez from 1734 to 1739.

Michel-Étienne Turgot was the father of the famous Anne Robert Jacques Turgot, economist and Minister of Louis XVI and Étienne-François Turgot, naturalist, administrator of Malta and governor of French Guiana. Son and father were buried in the Chapel of Hôpital Laënnec in Paris.

References

Bibliography 
 Bourne, Henry E. (1905). A History of Mediaeval and Modern Europe. New York: Longmans, Grenn.
 Phillips, Philip Lee (1909). A List of Geographical Atlases in the Library of Congress. Vol I: Atlases. Washington: Government Printing Office.
 Say, Léon (1888). Turgot, translated by Gustave Masson. London: George Routledge and Sons. Copy at the Internet Archive.

External links 
Plan de Paris, University of Southern Maine
Plan de Paris, University of Chicago
 Plan de Paris, scanned from the original edition, with zoom and navigation''

18th-century French cartographers
Artists from Paris
1690 births
1751 deaths
Members of the Académie des Inscriptions et Belles-Lettres
Provost of the Merchants of Paris